Noes may be:
 the plural of no
 Noës, a constituent village of Sierre, Switzerland
 Nóēs, a river name mentioned by Herodotus (see Novae (fortress)#Name of the site)

See also 
 Les Noës, a commune in the Loire department of France
 Les Noës-près-Troyes, a commune in the Aube department of France